Bridget Wiltshire (later: Wingfield, then Hervey, then Tyrwhitt; died January 1534) was a neighbour, close friend and lady-in-waiting to Anne Boleyn, the second wife of Henry VIII of England. She was the wife of Sir Richard Wingfield (widower of Catherine Woodville) and the daughter of Sir John Wiltshire of Stone Castle, Kent, a neighbour of the Boleyn family.

A letter written by Anne Boleyn to Bridget was used as evidence in the trial of the Queen for adultery, incest and conspiring against the life of the King. As Bridget had died, she could not refute the interpretation the prosecution placed on the Queen's words. The report also questioned the morality of Bridget: And note that this matter was disclosed by a woman called Lady Wingfield who was a servant of the said queen and shared the same tendencies. And suddenly the said Wingfield became ill and a little time before her death she showed the matter to one of those etc.

Family and career 
Bridget was born on an unknown date, the daughter of Sir John Wiltshire, and Margaret Graunt (daughter of Simon le Grand and Catherine Percy), of Stone Castle, in Shurland, Kent, She became a member of Catherine of Aragon's household, sometime before 1520, as Bridget was present at the Field of the Cloth of Gold in France. Sometime later, Bridget became a Lady of the Bedchamber to Queen Catherine's successor, Anne Boleyn.

Marriages and children 
In 1513, she married her first husband, Sir Richard Wingfield, courtier, diplomat, and Lord Deputy of Calais. He was one of twelve brothers and the widower of Catherine Woodville, a younger sister of Edward IV's queen consort Elizabeth Woodville. Together, Sir Richard and Bridget had ten children:
 Charles Wingfield (1513- 24 May 1540), married Joan Knollys, sister of Sir Francis Knollys, and sister-in-law of Catherine Carey, who was the niece of Anne Boleyn. Together, Charles and Joan had four children.
 Thomas Wingfield, Member of Parliament, married firstly Margaret Sabyn; he married secondly Margaret Kerrye, by whom he had issue, including celebrated Virginia colonist, Edward Maria Wingfield.
 Jacques Wingfield (1519- 1587), a politician in the service of Bishop Stephen Gardiner.
 Henry Wingfield
 Jane Wingfield, married firstly Thomas Worlich, by whom she had issue, and secondly Francis Roe.
 Mary Wingfield
 Margaret Wingfield, married firstly Sir Thomas Newman, and secondly a son of the Moyle family.
 Anne Wingfield, married into the Maidenhead family.
 Elizabeth Wingfield, married into the Latimer family.
 Catherine Wingfield

Sir Richard died in 1525, and she married secondly, a courtier, Sir Nicholas Hervey of Ickworth, Ambassador to Emperor Charles V, but a loyal supporter of Anne Boleyn. Bridget and Sir Nicholas had six children, George Hervey, Cecily Hervey, Bridget Hervey, Isabella Hervey, Eleanor Hervey and William Hervey. After the death of Sir Nicholas on 5 August 1532, Bridget married her third husband, Sir Robert Tyrwhitt, a man of whom Anne Boleyn did not approve. The two quarreled possibly on account of the latter's disapproval. Bridget is last mentioned in the list of New Years' Gifts in 1534, however, as there were many Lady Wingfields it is hard to be sure who was being referred to. She died after giving birth to Joan and Arthur Tyrwhitt by her third husband.

References 

English ladies-in-waiting
1534 deaths
Year of birth unknown
16th-century English women
People from the Borough of Dartford
Bridget
Household of Anne Boleyn
Wives of knights